Shanghai Pudong Development Bank Co. Ltd (SPDB or Pufa) is a state-owned joint-stock commercial bank, established in 1993, with its headquarters located in Shanghai.

Shanghai Pudong Development Bank issued a 400 million A-share offer on September 23, 1993, on the Shanghai Stock Exchange. It became the first shareholding commercial bank to list with both Central Bank and China Securities Regulatory Commission’s approval since the enactment of "Commercial Bank Law" and "Securities Law". Thus, the registered capital reached RMB 2.41 billion. 320 million shares of the issue were listed on the Shanghai Stock Exchange on November 10, 1999 (stock code 600000).

Purpose
The purpose of SPDB is to provide financial services for the development of Pudong, building Shanghai into one of the great international financial hubs, and to contribute to the national economic development and social progress.

By the end of 2004, the bank's total assets reached RMB 455.53 billion. The outstanding balance of all deposits stood at RMB 395.38 billion and outstanding loans of RMB 310.9 billion. After-tax profits totaled RMB 1930 million.

Bank branches

The bank has set up 30 branches and offices in Shanghai, Hangzhou, Ningbo, Nanjing, Beijing, Wenzhou (a sub-branch), Suzhou, Chongqing, Guangzhou, Shenzhen, Kunming, Wuhu (a sub-branch), Tianjin, Zhengzhou, Dalian, Jinan, Chengdu, Xi'an, Shenyang, Wuhan, Qingdao Branch, Taiyuan (source Company's Annual Report 2007), Hong Kong (since 2011).

In 2019, the bank's Hong Kong Branch moved into the top floors of 1 Hennessy Road, Wan Chai, a building that was therefore renamed into "SPD Bank Tower". The same building also houses SPDB International Holdings Limited and SITCOAM (Hong Kong) Holdings Limited.

Historical developments

In 2005, Citigroup, the world's largest financial services firm, expects to wrap up talks within months to raise its stake to nearly a fifth in China's Pudong Development Bank, a senior executive said. Citigroup wants to quadruple its stake in Pudong Bank to 19.9%.

Under an agreement forged in 2002, Citigroup already has the option to raise its stake to 24.9% by 2008. From its headquarters on Shanghai's historic Bund — the HSBC Building — Pudong Bank today commands 328 branches across the country.

Shanghai Pudong Development Bank partnered with Silicon Valley Bank in 2012 to create a separate Shanghai-based bank to lend to local technology startups. It was the first Sino-American joint venture bank.

China has made banking reform a priority, because it fears the sector's problems could jeopardize economic stability. It is urging banks, big and small, to find foreign investors and seek listings. Citigroup, which became the world's most valuable financial services firm through a series of big acquisitions, had been viewed as a potential player in any foreign investments in China. But it did not take an expected plunge with state-backed China Construction Bank, and watched as rival Bank of America agreed to pay $3 billion for 9% of the Chinese lender. Citigroup has made significant investments elsewhere in Asia, with a $2.7 billion purchase of KorAm Bank in South Korea.

In 2019, it was reported that the bank was under investigation for alleged money laundering and sanctions violations involving the North Korean regime. The bank allegedly moved money for the Foreign Trade Bank of the Democratic People's Republic of Korea that was used to finance the country's nuclear and ballistic missile programs.

References

External links

  

Companies in the CSI 100 Index
Companies listed on the Shanghai Stock Exchange
Government-owned companies of China
Banks established in 1993
Banks based in Shanghai